David Woodcock (August 31, 1785 in Williamstown, Berkshire County, Massachusetts – September 18, 1835 in Ithaca, Tompkins County, New York) was an American lawyer and politician from New York.

Life
Woodcock attended the public schools, then studied law, was admitted to the bar, and practiced. In 1807, he married Mary I. Baker (ca. 1787-1860). He moved to Ithaca, and he was appointed postmaster on November 19, 1808.

He was a member of the New York State Assembly (Seneca Co.) in 1814-15. He was District Attorney of the Thirteenth District (comprising Seneca, Tompkins, Cortland and Broome counties) from 1817 to 1818; and of Tompkins County from 1818 to 1823. He was the first President of the Cayuga Steamboat Company when it was organized in 1819.

Woodcock was elected as a Democratic-Republican to the 17th United States Congress, holding office from December 3, 1821, to March 3, 1823.

After leaving Congress Woodcock resumed the practice of law.  He was President and Trustee of the Village of Ithaca in 1823, 1824, and 1826. He was again a member of the State Assembly (Tompkins Co.) in 1826.

In 1826 Woodcock was elected to the 20th United States Congress, holding office from March 4, 1827, to March 3, 1829. He took a prominent part in the Anti-Masonic movement and was a delegate to the first Anti-Masonic Party State convention, which was held in Utica in August 1828.

After leaving Congress the second time, he again resumed the practice of law.  He died in 1835 and was buried at the City Cemetery in Ithaca.

His daughter Mary was married to New York Attorney General Stephen B. Cushing.

References

Sources

The New York Civil List compiled by Franklin Benjamin Hough (pages 71, 94, 190, 204, 317, 369, 383; Weed, Parsons and Co., 1858)

1785 births
1835 deaths
New York (state) National Republicans
People from Williamstown, Massachusetts
People from Tompkins County, New York
Members of the New York State Assembly
County district attorneys in New York (state)
New York (state) postmasters
Anti-Masonic Party politicians from New York (state)
Democratic-Republican Party members of the United States House of Representatives from New York (state)
National Republican Party members of the United States House of Representatives
19th-century American politicians